Sea silk is an extremely fine, rare, and valuable fabric that is made from the long silky filaments or byssus secreted by a gland in the foot of pen shells (in particular Pinna nobilis). The byssus is used by the clam to attach itself to the sea bed.

Sea silk was produced in the Mediterranean region from the large marine bivalve mollusc Pinna nobilis  until early in the 20th century. The animal, whose shell is sometimes almost a metre long, adheres itself pointed end down to rocks in the intertidal zone using a tuft of very strong thin fibres. These byssi or filaments (which can be six centimetres long) are spun and, when treated with lemon juice, turn a  golden colour, which never fades. 

The cloth produced from these filaments can be woven even more finely than silk, and is extremely light and warm; it was said that a pair of women's gloves made from the fabric could fit into half a walnut shell and a pair of stockings in a snuffbox. The cloth attracts clothes moths, the larvae of which will eat it.

Pinna nobilis is also sometimes gathered for its edible flesh and occasional pearls of fair quality.

History

Egypt
The Greek text of the (196 BC) Rosetta Stone records that Ptolemy V reduced taxes on priests, including one paid in byssus cloth. This is thought to be fine linen cloth, not sea silk. In Ancient Egyptian burial customs, byssus was used to wrap mummies; this was also linen and not sea silk.

Greece
The sophist author Alciphron first records "sea wool" in his (c. 2nd century AD) "Galenus to Cryton" letter.

Sea silk has been suggested as an interpretation of the nature of the golden fleece that was sought by Jason and the Argonauts but scholars reject this hypothesis.

Roman Empire
The early Christian Tertullian (c. 160–220 AD) mentions it when justifying his wearing a pallium instead of a toga.
Nor was it enough to comb and to sew the materials for a tunic. It was necessary also to fish for one's dress; for fleeces are obtained from the sea where shells of extraordinary size are furnished with tufts of mossy hair.

Several sources mention lana pinna ("pinna wool"). Emperor Diocletian's (301 AD) Edict on Maximum Prices lists it as a valuable textile.

The Byzantine historian Procopius's c. 550 AD Persian War, "stated that the five hereditary satraps (governors) of Armenia who received their insignia from the Roman Emperor were given chlamys (or cloaks) made from lana pinna. Apparently only the ruling classes were allowed to wear these chlamys."

Arabia
The Arabic name for "sea silk" is ṣūf al-baḥr ("sea wool"). The 9th-century Persian geographer Estakhri notes that a sea-wool robe cost more than 1000 gold pieces and records its mythic source.

At a certain period of the year an animal is seen running out of the sea and rubbing itself against certain stones of the littoral, whereupon it deposes a kind of wool of silken hue and golden colour. This wool is very rare and highly esteemed, and nothing of it is allowed to waste.

Two 13th-century authors, Ibn al-Baitar and Zakariya al-Qazwini, repeat this inaccurate "sea wool" story.

China
Beginning in the Eastern Han dynasty (25–220 AD), Chinese histories document importing sea silk. Chinese language names include "cloth from the west of the sea" and "mermaid silk".

The 3rd century AD Weilüe or "Brief Account of the Wei", which was an unofficial history of the Cao Wei empire (220–265 AD), records haixi ("West of the Sea") cloth made from shuiyang ("water sheep").

They have fine brocaded cloth that is said to be made from the down of "water-sheep". It is called Haixi ("Egyptian") cloth. This country produces the six domestic animals [traditionally: horses, cattle, sheep, chickens, dogs and pigs], which are all said to come from the water. It is said that they not only use sheep's wool, but also bark from trees, or the silk from wild silkworms, to make brocade, mats, pile rugs, woven cloth and curtains, all of them of good quality, and with brighter colours than those made in the countries of Haidong (East of the Sea).

The c. 5th century AD Hou Hanshu ("Book of the Eastern Han") expresses doubt about "water sheep" in the "Products of Daqin" section. "They also have a fine cloth which some people say is made from the down of 'water sheep,' but which is made, in fact, from the cocoons of wild silkworms". The historian Fan Ye (398–445 AD), author of the Hou Hanshu, notes this section's information comes from the report that General Ban Yong (son of General Ban Chao, 32–102 AD) presented to the Emperor in 125. Both Bans administered the Western Regions on the Silk Road.

The (945 AD) Tang shu "Book of Tang" mentioned Haixi cloth from Folin (Byzantine Syria), which Emil Bretschneider first identified as sea silk from Greece. "There is also a stuff woven from the hair of sea-sheep, and called hai si pu (stuff from the western sea)". He notes, "This is, perhaps, the Byssus, a clothstuff woven up to the present time by the Mediterranean coast, especially in Southern Italy, from the thread-like excrescences of several sea-shells, (especially Pinna nobilis)."

The early 6th century AD Shuyiji ("Records of Strange Things") mentions silk woven by Jiaoren, "jiao-dragon people", which Edward H. Schafer identifies as sea silk.
In the midst of the South Sea are the houses of the kău people who dwell in the water like fish, but have not given up weaving at the loom. Their eyes have the power to weep, but what they bring forth is pearls. 
This aquatic type of raw silk was called jiaoxiao, "mermaid silk", or jiaonujuan , "mermaid women's silk".

Modern Europe
The earliest usage of the English name sea silk remains uncertain, but the Oxford English Dictionary defines sea-silkworm as "a bivalve mollusc of the genus Pinna."

Alexander Serov's 1863 opera Judith includes an aria "I shall don my robe of byssus" (Я оденусь в виссон).

In Jules Verne's 1870 novel 20,000 Leagues Under the Sea, the crew of the Nautilus wear clothes made of byssus (alternately translated as "seashell tissue" or "fan-mussel fabric").

Pinna nobilis has become threatened with extinction, partly due to overfishing, the decline in seagrass fields, and pollution. As it has declined so dramatically, the once small but vibrant sea silk industry has almost disappeared, and the art is now preserved only by a few women on the island of Sant'Antioco near Sardinia. Chiara Vigo claimed on various media to be the sole person living today to master the art of working with byssus and the local people 
helped her to open the Sea Silk Museum in Sant'Antioco. "Project Sea-Silk" from the Natural History Museum of Basel is collecting extensive data and studies on the subject, and informs the public that a couple of other women still produce and work today with byssus in Sant'Antioco in Sardinia, such as the sisters Assuntina e Giuseppina Pes which contradicts the claims of Chiara Vigo who is credited as having "invented with an extraordinary imagination her own story of sea-silk and [spinning] it tirelessly and to the delight of all media on and on". In 2013, Efisia Murroni, a 100-year-old sea silk master weaver nicknamed "la signora del bisso" (born in 1913) died and her work is now shown in the Museo Etnografico di Sant'Antioco, with other artefacts being already on display in various museums throughout Europe.

See also
 Coa vestis, a textile made in ancient Greece from wild silk.

Footnotes

Citations

References
 Bretschneider, Emil. 1871. On the Knowledge Possessed by the Ancient Chinese of the Arabs and Arabian Colonies and Other Western Countries. Trubner.
 Hill, John E. (2009) Through the Jade Gate to Rome: A Study of the Silk Routes during the Later Han Dynasty, 1st to 2nd Centuries CE. John E. Hill. BookSurge, Charleston, South Carolina. . See Section 12 plus "Appendix B – Sea Silk".
 Hill, John E. 2004. The Peoples of the West. A draft annotated translation of the 3rd century Weilüe – see Section 12 of the text and Appendix D.
 Laufer, Berthold. 1915. "The Story of the Pinna and the Syrian Lamb", The Journal of American Folk-lore 28.108:103–128.
 McKinley, Daniel L. 1988. "Pinna and Her Silken Beard: A Foray into Historical Misappropriations". Ars Textrina: A Journal of Textiles and Costumes, Vol. Twenty-nine, June, 1998, Winnipeg, Canada, pp. 9–223.
 Maeder, Felicitas 2002. "The project Sea-silk – Rediscovering an Ancient Textile Material." Archaeological Textiles Newsletter, Number 35, Autumn 2002, pp. 8–11.
 Maeder, Felicitas, Hänggi, Ambros and Wunderlin, Dominik, Eds. 2004. Bisso marino: Fili d’oro dal fondo del mare – Muschelseide: Goldene Fäden vom Meeresgrund. Naturhistoriches Museum and Museum der Kulturen, Basel, Switzerland. (In Italian and German).
 Maeder, Felicitas. (2014). "Irritating Byssus – Etymological problems, material facts and the impact of mass media." Paper presented at: Textile Terminologies from the Orient to the Mediterranean and Europe 1000 BC – AD 1000. Copenhagen, 18–22 June 2014, pp. 1–17.
 Scales, Helen. 2015. Spirals in Time: The Secret Life and Curious Afterlife of Seashells. Bloomsbury Sigma.
 Schafer, Edward H. 1967. The Vermillion Bird: T'ang Images of the South. University of California Press.
 Turner, Ruth D. and Rosewater, Joseph 1958. "The Family Pinnidae in the Western Atlantic". Johnsonia, Vol. 3 No. 38, June 28, 1958, pp. 285–326.

Animal hair products
Fibers
Mollusc anatomy
Silk
Woven fabrics

de:Byssus
eo:Bisino
it:Bisso
lb:Byssus